Kelly's Olympian is among the oldest bars in Portland, Oregon, established in 1902. The space has been called a dive bar and a performance venue.

See also
 List of dive bars

References

External links
 
 Kelly's Olympian at Zomato

1902 establishments in Oregon
Dive bars in Portland, Oregon
Southwest Portland, Oregon